Jacques Hébert (1757–1794) was a French journalist and revolutionary.

The name may also refer to:

Jacques Hébert (Canadian politician) (1923–2007), member of the Senate of Canada
Jacques Hébert (French politician) (1920–2018), member of the French National Assembly